Kiril "Kiro" Dojčinovski (Macedonian: Kиpил Kиpo Дojчинoвcки; 17 October 1943 – 10 August 2022) was a Macedonian football player and manager who played as a defender.

Club career
Dojčinovski started playing in the youth team of FK Vardar in 1958. He successfully made his way into the senior squad, and after a few seasons he made a transfer to Red Star Belgrade. During his club career he played for Vardar Skopje, Crvena Zvezda, Troyes and Paris FC. With Red Star he won one Yugoslav championship and one cup.

International career
Dojčinovski had earned caps for the cadet, youth, Olympic and B Yugoslav national teams before debuting for the main senior national team.

He made his senior debut for Yugoslavia in an October 1968 FIFA World Cup qualification match against Spain and has earned a total of 6 caps, scoring no goals. His final international was a May 1970 friendly match against West Germany.

Managerial career
Dojčinovski later became a manager and coached the El Salvador national football team on two occasions. He also coached several clubs from El Salvador, Greece and Macedonia.

Personal life
In 2009, both of his legs were amputated due to complications from gangrene.

He died on 10 August 2022 at the age of 78.

Honours

Player
Red Star Belgrade
 Yugoslav First League: 1967–68, 1968–69, 1969–70, 1972–73
 Yugoslav Cup: 1967–68, 1969–70, 1970–71
 Mitropa Cup: 1967–68
 Iberico Trophy Badajoz: 1971
 Trofeo Costa del Sol: 1973
 Trofeo Naranja: 1973
 UEFA Champions League: semi-finalist 1970–71; quarter-finalist 1973–74
 UEFA Cup Winners' Cup: quarter-finalist 1971–72

Coach
Luis Angel Firpo
 Primera: 1991–92, 1992–93; runner-up: 1995–96

Notes

References

External links
 
 
 Career story at FFM 
 laprensa.com

1943 births
2022 deaths
Footballers from Skopje
Association football defenders
Macedonian footballers
Yugoslav footballers
Yugoslavia international footballers
1974 FIFA World Cup players
FK Vardar players
Red Star Belgrade footballers
ES Troyes AC players
Paris FC players
Yugoslav First League players
Ligue 1 players
Macedonian expatriate footballers
Yugoslav expatriate footballers
Expatriate footballers in France
Yugoslav expatriate sportspeople in France
Macedonian football managers
El Salvador national football team managers
Yugoslav expatriate sportspeople in El Salvador
Macedonian expatriate sportspeople in El Salvador
FK Vardar managers
C.D. Luis Ángel Firpo managers
Iraklis Thessaloniki F.C. managers
FK Makedonija Gjorče Petrov managers
FK Pelister managers
Municipal Limeño managers
FK Bregalnica Delčevo managers
Platense F.C. managers
FK Bregalnica Štip managers
Expatriate football managers in El Salvador
Expatriate football managers in Greece
Macedonian expatriate sportspeople in Greece
Expatriate football managers in Honduras
Macedonian expatriate sportspeople in Honduras